Fazilpur Jharsa is a village in the Gurgaon mandal of Gurgaon district in the state of Haryana in India. It is located on the Sohna Road. Fazilpur Jharsa's pincode is 122101 and Post office name is. Other villages in within the pincode area are Kadipur and Teekli.

References 

Villages in Gurgaon district